Cheryl Ann Marie Anderson is an American epidemiologist. Anderson is a professor at and founding Dean of the University of California San Diego Herbert Wertheim School of Public Health and Human Longevity Science. Anderson's research focus is on nutrition and chronic disease prevention in under-served human populations.

Education 
Anderson completed a bachelor of arts with honors in health and society from Brown University in 1992. She earned a master of public health in 1994 from University of North Carolina at Chapel Hill. In 1997, Anderson completed a master of science in the department of epidemiology at University of Washington. Her master's thesis was titled Dietary factors in Parkinson's disease: the role of food groups and specific foods. She obtained a doctor of philosophy from the University of Washington department of epidemiology interdisciplinary program in nutritional sciences in 2001. Her dissertation was titled The response of blood folate levels to folic acid supplementation: results from a crossover trial. Anderson's doctoral advisors were Shirley A. A. Beresford and Johanna Lampe. Anderson completed a postdoctoral fellowship at University of Washington in 2002.

Career 
Anderson was an affiliate member in the Cancer Prevention Research Program at Fred Hutchinson Cancer Research Center from 2001 to 2002. She was an instructor of epidemiology from 2002 to 2005 in the department of biostatistics and epidemiology at University of Pennsylvania Center for Clinical Epidemiology and Biostatistics. Anderson was an assistant scientist from 2005 to 2007 in the department of epidemiology at Johns Hopkins Bloomberg School of Public Health. She was core faculty at the Welch Center for Prevention, Epidemiology, and Clinical Research from 2006 to 2012 at Johns Hopkins Medical Institutions. She served a joint appointment as an assistant professor in the division of general medicine at Johns Hopkins School of Medicine and the departments of epidemiology and international health (human nutrition) in Bloomberg School of Public Health. She was the director of the bachelor of science in the public health program at University of California, San Diego from 2012 to 2014. In 2015, she became the co-director of the University of California San Diego Center of Excellence in Health Promotion and Health Equity. She became an associate professor in 2012 in the department of family medicine and public health at UC San Diego School of Medicine. In 2019 Anderson founded The Herbert Wertheim School of Public Health and Human Longevity Science at UC San Diego with the goal of furthering research and education focused on preventing disease, prolonging life, and promoting health through organized community efforts.

Research 
Anderson's research focus is in epidemiology, specifically working on the understanding of nutrition and prevention of chronic disease in under-served populations. Her work uses observational epidemiological studies, randomized clinical trials and implementation science. She is involved in several research projects including the California Teachers Study and the  RESOLVE to save 100 million lives D&I initiative. Additionally she will be beginning a clinical trial to determine how dietary sodium is used in the body in September 2020. Anderson's work delves into the effects of dietary patterns, sodium, and potassium intake on blood pressure and cardiovascular diseases, behavioral interventions for adherence to dietary recommendations, and identification of nutritional risk factors and for progression of kidney disease and development of cardiovascular events in individuals with chronic kidney disease.

Awards and honors 

 Fellow of the American Heart Association. 
 Elected to membership in the National Academy of Medicine in 2016. 
 Principal Investigator on The US Ten Day Seminar on the Epidemiology and Prevention of Cardiovascular Disease since 2017.

Selected publications 

 Sugar-Sweetened Beverage Intake and Cardiovascular Disease Risk in the California Teachers Study. J Am Heart Assoc. 2020 May 18; 9(10):e014883. Pacheco LS, Lacey JV, Martinez ME, Lemus H, Araneta MRG, Sears DD, Talavera GA, Anderson CAM.  PMID 32397792.
 Dietary Patterns to Reduce Weight and Optimize Cardiovascular Health: Persuasive Evidence for Promoting Multiple, Healthful Approaches. Circulation. 2018 03 13; 137(11):1114-1116. Anderson CAM.  PMID 29483087.
 Measurements of 24-Hour Urinary Sodium and Potassium Excretion: Importance and Implications. JAMA. 2018 03 27; 319(12):1201-1202. Ix JH, Anderson CAM.  PMID 29516102.
 Effects of Sodium Reduction on Energy, Metabolism, Weight, Thirst, and Urine Volume: Results From the DASH (Dietary Approaches to Stop Hypertension)-Sodium Trial. Hypertension. 2020 Mar; 75(3):723-729. Juraschek SP, Miller ER, Chang AR, Anderson CAM, Hall JE, Appel LJ.  PMID 31957521.
 Diet Soda Consumption and Risk of Incident End Stage Renal Disease. Clin J Am Soc Nephrol. 2017 01 06; 12(1):79-86. Rebholz CM, Grams ME, Steffen LM, Crews DC, Anderson CA, Bazzano LA, Coresh J, Appel LJ.  PMID 27797893.
 Salt Sensitivity of Blood Pressure: A Scientific Statement From the American Heart Association. Hypertension. 2016 09; 68(3):e7-e46. Elijovich F, Weinberger MH, Anderson CA, Appel LJ, Bursztyn M, Cook NR, Dart RA, Newton-Cheh CH, Sacks FM, Laffer CL.  PMID 27443572

References 

Living people
Year of birth missing (living people)
Members of the National Academy of Medicine
20th-century American scientists
21st-century American scientists
20th-century American women scientists
21st-century American women scientists
Brown University alumni
University of Pennsylvania faculty
Johns Hopkins Bloomberg School of Public Health faculty
University of California, San Diego faculty
University of Washington School of Public Health alumni
American women epidemiologists
American epidemiologists
American women academics
20th-century African-American women
20th-century African-American scientists
21st-century African-American women
21st-century African-American scientists